The 3 arrondissements of the Doubs department are:
 Arrondissement of Besançon, (prefecture of the Doubs department: Besançon) with 256 communes. The population of the arrondissement was 249,211 in 2016.  
 Arrondissement of Montbéliard, (subprefecture: Montbéliard) with 168 communes. The population of the arrondissement was 176,425 in 2016.  
 Arrondissement of Pontarlier, (subprefecture: Pontarlier) with 149 communes. The population of the arrondissement was 112,913 in 2016.

History

In 1800 the arrondissements of Besançon, Baume-les-Dames, Pontarlier and Saint-Hippolyte were established. In 1816 Montbéliard replaced Saint-Hippolyte as subprefecture. The arrondissement of Baume-les-Dames was disbanded in 1926. The arrondissement of Pontarlier was expanded in January 2009 with the two cantons of Pierrefontaine-les-Varans and Vercel-Villedieu-le-Camp from the arrondissement of Besançon, and the canton of Le Russey from the arrondissement of Montbéliard.

References

Doubs